M120 Rak is a self-propelled wheeled gun-mortar equipped with an automatically loaded 120 mm mortar mounted on a tracked (SMG 120 / M120G) and wheeled (SMK 120 / M120K) chassis, designed by Huta Stalowa Wola (HSW). It is produced in Poland, and used by Polish Land Forces. Serial production and the first delivery started in 2017.

History 
Work on the Rak mortar started in 2006, the first prototypes were presented in 2009. Initially designed by HSW, later with co-financing from the Ministry of Science and Higher Education. Most of the mortar elements are produced in Poland. HSW has received several patents for the construction of individual mortar solutions.

In April 2016, with the consortium of HSW and ROSOMAK S.A., a contract was signed for the supply of eight KMO Rak systems (64 M120K mortars and 32 artillery command vehicles (AWD)) in 2017–2019. In October 2019, another contract was signed for the supply of two KMO Rak systems (18 M120K mortars and 8 AWD) and two mortars for training at the Centrum Szkolenia Artylerii i Uzbrojenia (Artillery and Armament Training Center) in Toruń. In May 2020, the Inspektorat Uzbrojenia (Armaments Inspectorate) signed a contract with the consortium for the delivery of another 5 KMO Rak systems (40 RAK mortars and 20 AWD).

Description 
The Rak Mortar can be built on a variety of chassis. The tracked chassis version is based on the lightweight HSW tracked chassis (which was developed from the Opal APC), while the wheeled chassis is based on the Rosomak APC. In 2013, as part of the MSPO exhibition, the manufacturer presented the implementation of the mortar on the chassis of the German Marder infantry fighting vehicle. The fire set of the 120 mm self-propelled mortars, Rak, consists of eight cannons, used to throw mortar grenades at a distance. It is able to make accurate shots at distances from 8 to 12 km. In addition to standard grenades, it can fire shells with a HEAT charge, fighting armored vehicles, such as combat vehicles, smoke and lighting ammunition. The time of moving from the march position to the combat position is 30 seconds (maximum). The firing position can be left within 15 seconds after the last grenade is fired.

The complete Rak mortar system, apart from the latter, includes accompanying vehicles: artillery command vehicles (AWD), reconnaissance vehicles, technical and logistic support vehicles (ammunition vehicles) and armaments repair vehicles (AWRU). The vehicle is equipped with a digital fire control system, including with a thermal camera and a laser rangefinder, so it can work effectively during the day and at night. The data may, inter alia, draw from the FlyEye unmanned aerial vehicle. The Rak mortar can fire remotely as an unmanned weapon, using commands and data transmitted electronically to the vehicle's computer. Initially, until the implementation of modern ammunition with a range of 10,000 m, Polish Rak mortars use old OF843B grenades for towed mortars, modernized with special fittings, with a weight of 16.02 kg and a range of 6,900 m, intended for training.

Technical and tactical data 

 Caliber 120 mm 
 Number of barrels 1 
 Stock of ammunition 46 pieces 
 Maximum range 12,000 m 
 Time to be ready to fire 30 s 
 Time to leave the firing position 15 s

See also 
 AMOS
 Patria NEMO
 Light-weight Combat Vehicle (LCV) System

References 

Military vehicles of Poland
Science and technology in Poland
120 mm artillery
Gun-mortars
Self-propelled artillery of Poland
Mortar carriers